The Maatsuyker Islands are a group of islands and rocks  off the south coast of Tasmania, Australia.  Maatsuyker Island is the southernmost island of the group and of the Australian continental shelf. There are exposed rocks further south of Maatsuyker but they do not meet the definition of "islands". Macquarie Island, far to the south, is also Australian territory but it is an upthrust piece of ocean floor in the remote Southern Ocean and is in a geological sense completely separate from the continent.

The group is noted for its rich marine wildlife, predominantly wet and windy weather conditions, and Australia's most southerly lighthouse. The group are contained within the Southwest National Park, part of the Tasmanian Wilderness World Heritage Site.

Geography

Main group
The group consists of at least six islands and two groups of rocks. Needle Rocks, also known unofficially as The Needles, lie just off the south west tip of Maatsuyker Island. Walker Island, Flat Witch Island and the Western Rocks lie just to the north.

Sources differ on whether nearby islands are part of the group. The Tasmanian Parks and Wildlife Service includes only the base set above. In his seminal work, Tasmania's offshore islands, Nigel Brothers includes four extra in an extended group.

The islands are erosional remnants of the Tasmanian mainland, and are typically steep-sided and rocky.

Related islands
White and Brothers refer to islands in addition to those in the group. These include Breaksea Islands, Eddystone, Kathleen Island, Mewstone, Pedra Branca, Shanks Islands and Trumpeter Islets. Several of these are quite distant from Maatsuyker Island.

History

Etymology
Abel Tasman led the first known European expedition to reach Tasmania. His journal records that he first sighted Tasmania on 24 November 1642.  The translation of the journal entry for 1 December 1642, seven days later, refers to Wit's islands, Sueers islands, Maetsuickers islands (Maatsuyker Islands) and Boereels islands. The names of all of these islands and Tasmania itself under its then name of Van Diemens Land were all names of then members of the Council of India of Tasman's employer, the Dutch East India Company (see Tasman's 1642 orders in Appendix D of the journal).  Antonio Van Diemen was the Governor-General and so got the name of the largest island.  This journal entry for 1 December came only 7 days after the first sighting of Tasmania, so it is evident that the Maatsuyker Islands Group was named in honour of Joan Maetsuycker (today's spelling would be Johan), who was also a councillor.

Other, more recent theories about the origin of the name have also been offered:

 The island was named after a member of Abel Tasman's crew, Mr. Maatsuyker.  However, the ship's log book has been preserved and there was not anyone on board with that name.
 It has been suggested that the word in Dutch means "mate seeker" and that the sealers of old stopped at the island seeking Aboriginal women as wives.  However, "seeker" in Dutch is "zoeker", not "suicker." Nevertheless, there is direct evidence that Aborigine people visited the island possibly thousands of years before European settlement.
 The word in Dutch means "measure of sugar". This has led some people to suggest - erroneously - that the island, capped with guano, may have resembled a tablespoon of sugar rising above the surface of the sea and that inspired the name.

Lighthouse

In 1891 a lighthouse was completed on Maatsuyker Island and until today it remains Australia's most southerly lighthouse. From the inauguration until the installation of the automated light, the lighthouse maintained a small staff of lighthouse keepers, who constituted the total population of the island.

Maatsuyker Island Lighthouse was the last Australian lighthouse still being officially operated by lightkeepers.  A second, smaller and automated lighthouse was installed in 1996 but it is unclear whether volunteers are going to continue to work the lights on Maatsuyker Island.

Climate
Weather conditions in the area can be extreme, with the Roaring Forties wind being a particular problem. The maximum wind gust ever recorded was 176 km/h. Reportedly, the first keepers of the light took chickens with them to Maatsuyker but the fowls blew away into the ocean. Given the wind and lack of shelter, this is possible if they were left outside during storms. Vegetables get blown flat by the wind, but surprisingly, can be grown successfully, even though the garden is on the west side of the island, facing into the prevailing winds.

There are an average of 249 rain days a year.

Flora and fauna

Flora
Maatsuyker Island supports a surprising variety of flora and fauna, although the flora is limited in size by the windy conditions. The soil is reportedly extremely rich due to thousands of years of sea bird guano deposits, and supports a variety of native and imported flora. As a testament to fertility, potatoes sown by former lighthouse keepers now grow wild.

Fauna
Seals are common and include both New Zealand and Australian fur seals, and southern elephant seal.

The Maatsuyker group is well known for its abundant bird life. Sea birds present include the critically endangered northern soft-plumaged petrel (Pterodroma mollis deceptornis).  The first record of soft-plumaged petrels breeding in Australia is from Maatsuyker.  The group has been identified by BirdLife International as an Important Bird Area (IBA) because it supports over 1% of the world populations of short-tailed shearwaters (about 1.5 million pairs), fairy prions and black-faced cormorants, as well as thousands of pairs of little penguins and common diving-petrels.

See also

 South East Cape
 South West Cape
 List of islands of Tasmania

References

External links

 
 Report from a trip through the Maatsuyker Islands to Maatsuyker Island
 Second page of the report of the trip to Maatsuyker Island
 Picture of the De Witt Island
 Picture of some of the Maatsuyker Islands
 Another map of the area between South East Cape and South West Cape and the Maatsuyker Islands
 Friends of Maatsuyker Island CARes group

Islands of Tasmania
Protected areas of Tasmania
South coast of Tasmania
Important Bird Areas of Tasmania
Islands of Australia (Tenure: State Reserve)
Maritime history of the Dutch East India Company